Pertti Teurajärvi (born 20 February 1951, in Kolari) is a Finnish former cross-country skier who competed in the late 1970s and early 1980s. He won two medals in the 4 × 10 km relay at the Winter Olympics with a gold in 1976 and a bronze in 1980.

Teurajärvi also won a silver medal in the 4 × 10 km relay at the 1978 FIS Nordic World Ski Championships in Lahti. His best individual event was fourth in a World Cup event in 1982 in West Germany.

Doping ban 
Teurajärvi tested positive for prolintane at the 1982 Finnish Skiing Championships and was subsequently handed a one-year ban from sport for the anti-doping rule violation.

Cross-country skiing results
All results are sourced from the International Ski Federation (FIS).

Olympic Games
 2 medals – 1 gold, 1 bronze)

World Championships
 1 medal – (1 silver)

World Cup

Season standings

References

External links 
 
 

1951 births
Living people
People from Kolari
Finnish male cross-country skiers
Cross-country skiers at the 1976 Winter Olympics
Cross-country skiers at the 1980 Winter Olympics
Olympic medalists in cross-country skiing
FIS Nordic World Ski Championships medalists in cross-country skiing
Finnish sportspeople in doping cases
Doping cases in cross-country skiing
Medalists at the 1976 Winter Olympics
Medalists at the 1980 Winter Olympics
Olympic gold medalists for Finland
Olympic bronze medalists for Finland
Olympic cross-country skiers of Finland
Sportspeople from Lapland (Finland)
20th-century Finnish people